Joe Gooch (born 3 May 1977) is an English musician who was known as the lead vocalist and lead guitarist of Ten Years After from 2003 to 2014.

Biography
Gooch was introduced to jazz and blues at an early age. By thirteen, taking his music seriously, he enrolled on a course of classical guitar lessons. The disciplines he learned were good grounding for him, but he soon realised his interest lay outside of the classical sphere, and moved towards rock and blues. At first he was influenced by his childhood heroes, Larry Carlton, Steely Dan, The Beatles, Jimi Hendrix, Eric Clapton, Led Zeppelin, Buddy Guy and later Frank Zappa. Gooch replaced Alvin Lee in Ten Years After, with  limited success, and later formed Hundred Seventy Split with bassist Leo Lyons.

In January 2014, it was announced that both Gooch and Lyons had left Ten Years After.

Album discography
SiRO
SiRO – 1999

Ten Years After
Now – 2004
Roadworks (Live) – 2005
Evolution – 2008
Live at Fiesta City (DVD) – 2009

Hundred Seventy Split
The World Won't Stop – 2011
Hundred Seventy Split – 2014

References

External links
 Ten Years After website
 Hundred Seventy Split website

1977 births
Living people
English rock singers
English blues singers
English rock guitarists
English blues guitarists
English male guitarists
English male singer-songwriters
English rock musicians
English blues musicians
Blues singer-songwriters
Electric blues musicians
Blues rock musicians
British blues (genre) musicians
Lead guitarists
People from Highbury
Singers from London
Ten Years After members
21st-century British guitarists
21st-century English singers
21st-century British male singers